Oles Hennadiyovych Sanin (born July 30, 1972 in Kamin-Kashyrskyi) is a Ukrainian film director, actor, cinematographer, producer, musician and sculptor. Distinguished Artist of Ukraine; he was awarded the Alexander Dovzhenko Ukrainian State Award.

Biography 
Born in Kamin-Kashyrskyi in the Volyn Oblast. He graduated of the Ivan Karpenko-Kary National University of Theatre, Film and TV in Kyiv in 1993 in the actor's class (tutor: Valentyna Zymniya) and finished the film directing course for feature films (tutor: Leonid Osyka) in 1998. He made his internships in the Netherlands and the United States. In the years 1994–2000 he worked as a film director, director of photography, director of the production in the feature and documentary films' section of the Ukrainian branch of the international organisation Internews Network (presently Internews). He produced several dozen documentaries (e.g. for such stations as Internews Network, Canal+, the Ukrainian TV channel 1+1, NTV, TNT, Polsat, DALAS studio, IKON, PRO Helvecia). He was the director of photography of several documentary films and directed a few documentary and feature short films.

Sanin presides over the Ukrainian Association of Young Cinematographers.

He plays the bandura, torban, hurdy-gurdy and follows the Volhynia tradition of hurdy-gurdy players.

He used to make musical instruments himself, mastering the craft of his grandfather. Using the pseudonym Oleś Smyk, he is a member of the Kyiv Kobzar Gild.

Two of his feature films, the debut Mamay (2003) and 
The Guide (2014), were official Ukrainian entries for the Academy Award for Best Foreign Language Film.

The Guide about the fate of Ukrainian kobzars was premiered on October 10, 2014 at the 30th Warsaw Film Festival.

Awards and honors 
 Alexander Dovzhenko Ukrainian State Award for the film Mamay (2003), 
 Silver Medal of the Ukrainian Academy of Arts
 The Lumière Brothers' Silver Medal.

Filmography

Feature films 
 1995 – Atentat – osinnie vbivstwo u Miunkheni (The Assassination – the Autumn Assassination in Munich) (actor)
 2003 – Mamay (film director, screenwriter, actor)
 2012 – Match (The Match) (assistant director)
 2013 – The Guide (meaning The Guide or flowers have eyes) (film director, screenwriter)

Documentary films 
 1994 – Matinka Nadiya (Mother Nadia)
 1994 – Buria (The Storm)
 1995 – Zymno (Winter)
 1996 – Pustyn''' (Deserts)
 1998 – Tanok morzha (The Danse of the Walrus) (co-authored)
 1999 – Natsiya. Lemky (A Nation – Lemkos)
 1999 – Natsiya. Yevreyi (A Nation – Jews)
 1999 – Hrikh (Sin)
 2000 – Rizdvo, abo iak Hutsuly kintsia svitu chekaly (Christmas or how the Hutsuls were awaiting the Doomsday) 
 2001 – Аkvarel' (The Watercolour)
 2005 – Den' siomyi (The Seventh Day) (film director)
 2008 – Perebyzhchyk (The Defector) (co-authored with Mark Jonathan Harris)
 2017 – Perelomnyi moment: vijna za demokratiyu v Ukrayini (Breaking Point: The War for Democracy in Ukraine '') (co-authored with Mark Jonathan Harris)

Notes

External links 

 
 Official page of The Guide (eng. and ukr.)
 Sanin about his film The Guide at the 30th Warsaw Film Festival, 10.2014 (ukr.)
 http://www.wff.pl/en/filmy/the-guide01/
 http://povodyr.com/en/authors.html
 Note on the Ukrainian Film Club of Columbia University (2014.10.26)

Ukrainian film directors
Ukrainian screenwriters
Ukrainian sculptors
Ukrainian male sculptors
1972 births
Living people
Laureates of the Oleksandr Dovzhenko State Prize